Pilibail Yamunakka is a Tulu language film directed by K Sooraj Shetty, starring Pruthvi ambaar, Sonal Monteiro, Naveen D Padil in lead roles. The movie has been produced by Rohan Shetty under the banner of Lakumi Cine Creations. Audio launch of this film was held on 19 June 2016. The movie released  on 9 December 2016. This film successfully completed 168 days. Mangalore's Hip hop singer and rapper YemZii was also first introduced in this movie. He rapped in Tulu and English in a song called "Kaar baar Jorundu" featuring Nakash Aziz.

Plot 
Yamunakka, is an 80 year old egoistic lady, living in Pilibail with her family. Gautham, an unemployed man living with his friends in the city, accidentally happens to meet Nisha (Yamunakka's Grand daughter), which in turn results in Gautham & his friends relocating to Pilibail. What happens in Pilibail when Yamunakka and Gautham meet is where the story builds up, revealing other suspense around them.

Cast 
 Pruthvi Ambaar as Gautham 
 Sonal Monteiro as Nisha
 Chandrakala as Yamunakka
 Naveen D. Padil
 Aravind Bolar
 Bhojaraj Vamanjoor
 Sathish Bandale

Soundtrack

The songs of this film are sung by Bollywood singers such as Shreya Ghoshal, Kunal Ganjawala, and Nakash Aziz.

Song list

References